Kalana may refer to:

Kalana, Mali, town in Gouandiaka Commune, Yanfolila Cercle, Sikasso Region, Mali
Kalana, Hiiu County, village in Hiiu Parish, Hiiu County, Estonia
Kalana, Jõgeva County, village in Pajusi Parish, Jõgeva County, Estonia
Kalana Greene (born 1987), American basketball player